South Fork Fryingpan River is a tributary of the Fryingpan River in Pitkin County, Colorado. It flows north from a source in the Hunter-Fryingpan Wilderness to a confluence with the Fryingpan River in the White River National Forest.

See also
List of rivers of Colorado

References

Rivers of Colorado
Rivers of Pitkin County, Colorado
Tributaries of the Colorado River in Colorado